Grandeur of the Seas is a Vision-class cruise ship owned and operated by Royal Caribbean International. Features include a full-service spa, six whirlpools, an outdoor jogging track and a number of bars and restaurants. It was announced on 16 October 2019 that Grandeur of the Seas will be transferred in the second quarter of 2021 to Pullmantur Cruises, in which Royal Caribbean has a 49% stake. These plans were cancelled in mid-2020.

Features

Grandeur of the Seas features an on-board casino, Casino Royale, on Deck 5. The casino has many slot machines, variations of poker, craps, blackjack, and a bar. There are also eight themed bars and lounges, including the pool deck bar, South Pacific Lounge, Schooner, The Viking Lounge, and several unnamed areas. There is an open atrium, called the Centrum, that stretches from deck 4 to deck 10. An outdoor pool is found on the top open deck (deck 9) along with 4 whirlpool areas, 2 on the starboard side and 2 on the port side. Off of the pool is the Solarium area with a pool and 2 whirlpools, 1 on the starboard side and 1 on the port side. There is a jogging track on deck 10.  Several youth facilities are scattered about the ship, including an arcade area, a teen nightclub, and the Explorations desk on deck 5. A special edition of The Compass called Explorations is published specifically for children. The Spa and Fitness Center can be found on deck 9. The main dining area, the Great Gatsby, is located on decks 4 and 5. Guests are seated in two shifts on deck four of the main dining (5:30 pm ship's time) and 8:00 pm (ship's time) or anytime in my time dining from 5:00–830 PM (ship's time) on deck 5. The shows in The Palladium (the main theater, found on decks 5 and 6), are designed around the dining room times. The ship also contains a conference center, a library with an honor checkout system and a buffet called The Windjammer Market Place, 2 shuffle board courts, a rock wall with areas for climbers of various skills, a photo shop, several stores specializing on jewelry, souvenirs, cigars, cigarettes, and liquor, and a piano area.

Ports of call
Grandeur of the Seas was initially deployed on 7 night cruises from Miami, Florida, to the Eastern Caribbean from 1996 to 2000, when Explorer of the Seas was launched and took over the Grandeur's run. Since 2000, Grandeur of the Seas has been deployed in Europe as well as back in the Caribbean homeported in cities such as Tampa, Ft. Lauderdale, and New Orleans. Summers have been spent in Eastern US ports such as Norfolk, Virginia; Baltimore, Maryland and Philadelphia, Pennsylvania, visiting the Caribbean, Bermuda and the North East of the US and Canadian Maritimes.

Grandeur of the Seas was based out of Panama in the winter of 2010/2011, replacing her sister ship, Enchantment of the Seas. In 2013, Grandeur of the Seas replaced Enchantment of the Seas out of Baltimore when Enchantment of the Seas moved to Port Canaveral. , the ship offers cruises to Bermuda and the southeast US coast, the Bahamas, and the Southern Caribbean, all departing from Baltimore, Maryland.

On July 28, 2021, Royal Caribbean announced that Grandeur of the Sea would homeport out of Bridgetown, Barbados for the winter 2021-2022 season, visiting southern Caribbean destinations on "island hopping" cruises.

Incidents and accidents

Power loss
On 31 October 2000, Grandeur of the Seas lost power for 5.5 hours with power to lighting, plumbing and air conditioning restored by 10:45 a.m.  The ship was towed to Willemstad, Curaçao where repairs were made and got back underway 12 hours late.

Dock collision
The company said that  winds and a  current contributed to the accident. The next seven-day cruise was shortened to five as the ship had to remain in Costa Maya an extra 2 days awaiting materials to patch the hole. Royal Caribbean offered guests transportation back to New Orleans or onboard credit if they chose to stay with the ship. The ship was later dry docked and the damage was repaired.

Ship-board fire
On 27 May 2013 at 2:50 am EDT, a fire broke out on the third deck of Grandeur of the Seas. The fire was extinguished within three hours, and major damage was limited to the aftmost sections of decks 3, 4, and 5. As a precaution, all passengers were required to report to evacuation locations for several hours. No evacuation was necessary, and the ship was able to continue under her own power to the Bahamas. The remainder of the cruise was canceled and passengers were flown back to their point of origin from Freeport, Bahamas.

Capsized lifeboat
On 16 January 2017, a lifeboat fell off of Grandeur of the Seas while it was docked in Charleston as part of a 10-day Bahamas cruise. The fall wire of the lifeboat was undergoing scheduled maintenance and the wire slipped during retrieval, causing the lifeboat to fall into the water. The lifeboat subsequently capsized. No injuries were reported and the cruise was not delayed after Royal Caribbean consulted with the US Coast Guard.

Mechanical issues
In the early hours of 9 January 2018, Grandeur of the Seas experienced a loss of port side steering while on its way from Nassau, Bahamas to Baltimore, Maryland. The ship was able to travel safely, and turned around towards Freeport, Bahamas, but arrived in Port Canaveral on 10 January 2018. The detour and repair work ultimately added 2 nights to the 9-night cruise, with the ship arriving back in Baltimore on 13 January 2018 instead of the originally planned 11 January 2018. As a result, the subsequent cruise was shortened by two nights.

Coronavirus quarantine 
On 12 March 2020, Grandeur of the Seas was denied a request to berth at the Austin "Babe" Monsanto Marine Terminal in the United States Virgin Islands because a crew member had travelled to Japan within the previous two weeks, even though no confirmed cases of coronavirus were on board. However, the ship was eventually allowed to return to transport a seriously-injured passenger to a hospital for treatment.

References

Further reading

External links

Official website

1996 ships
Maritime incidents in 2000
Maritime incidents in 2005
Maritime incidents in 2013
Ships built in Helsinki
Ships of Royal Caribbean International